Buckland is a city in Northwest Arctic Borough, Alaska, United States. At the 2010 census the population was 416, up from 406 in 2000.

Geography
Buckland is located at  (65.984795, -161.129717).

Demographics

Buckland first appeared on the 1920 U.S. Census as an unincorporated village. Around 1950, residents relocated temporarily to Elephant Point (AKA Buckland Post Office) on Eschscholtz Bay, and Buckland did not report a population for the 1950 census (108 was reported for Elephant Point). Residents soon returned to Buckland, and it has reported in every successive census since 1960 and formally incorporated in 1966.

As of the census of 2000, there were 406 people, 84 households, and 75 families residing in the city. There were 89 housing units at an average density of 72.8 per square mile (28.2/km). The racial makeup of the city was 3.20% White, 95.81% Native American, and 0.99% from two or more races.  1.23% of the population were Hispanic or Latino of any race.

There were 84 households, out of which 66.7% had children under the age of 18 living with them, 65.5% were married couples living together, 20.2% had a female householder with no husband present, and 10.7% were non-families. 8.3% of all households were made up of individuals, and 1.2% had someone living alone who was 65 years of age or older.  The average household size was 4.83 and the average family size was 5.19.

In the city, the age distribution of the population shows 51.2% under the age of 18, 10.8% from 18 to 24, 24.4% from 25 to 44, 10.1% from 45 to 64, and 3.4% who were 65 years of age or older. The median age was 18 years. For every 100 females age 18 and over, there were 106.3 males.

The median income for a household in the city was $38,333, and the median income for a family was $40,000. Males had a median income of $31,563 versus $27,500 for females. The per capita income for the city was $9,624.  About 7.9% of families and 11.9% of the population were below the poverty line, including 14.4% of those under age 18 and none of those age 65 or over.

Education
The Buckland School, operated by the Northwest Arctic Borough School District, serves the community.  it had 168 students, with Alaska Natives making up 96% of the student body. The current school building opened in 2002.

References

Cities in Alaska
Cities in Northwest Arctic Borough, Alaska
Populated places in the Seward Peninsula